Nankou railway station is a railway station in Beijing. The station was opened in 1906.

Schedules 

10 passenger trains stop at the station every day, they are trains 7235, 4434, 7236, 1455, K274, 7173, 7174, 1456, K273, and 4433.

Note:  Updated in May 2006, the train schedule will change on October 1, 2006.

References

Railway stations in Beijing
Railway stations in China opened in 1906